The 1988 Utah gubernatorial election was held on November 8, 1988. Republican nominee and incumbent Governor Norman H. Bangerter defeated Democratic nominee Ted Wilson and independent Merrill Cook with 40.13% of the vote. As of 2023, this is the closest a Democrat has come to winning the governorship in Utah since Scott M. Matheson left office in 1985.

Republican nomination

Candidates

Declared
Norman H. Bangerter, incumbent Governor
Dean Samuels, teacher

Withdrawn
Jon Huntsman Sr., industrialist and former White House Staff Secretary

Results
Bangerter defeated Samuels at the state convention on June 11 with over 70% of the vote and therefore avoided a primary.

Democratic nomination

Candidates

Declared
Ted Wilson, former Mayor of Salt Lake City
David E. Hewett, physician

Results
Wilson defeated Hewett at the state convention on June 25 with over 70% of the vote and therefore avoided a primary.

American Party nomination

Candidates

Declared
Arly H. Pedersen, National Chairman
Lawrence Ray Topham, perennial candidate

Results
Pedersen defeated Topham at the state convention on June 25 with over 70% of the vote and therefore avoided a primary.

General election

Polling

Candidates
Ted Wilson, Democratic
Norm Bangerter, Republican
Arly H. Pedersen, American
Merrill Cook, Independent
Kitty K. Burton, Libertarian

Results

References

Bibliography
 
 

1988
Utah
Gubernatorial
November 1988 events in the United States